Steven Hunter Jones (born March 6, 1951) is a former American football running back who played in the National Football League (NFL) in the 1970s.

After playing college football at Duke University where he was named Atlantic Coast Conference (ACC) player of the year in his senior year, he played six seasons in the National Football League.  He was a fifth-round draft choice by Los Angeles in 1973, then briefly acquired by the Cardinals before being picked up by the Buffalo Bills, where he played behind O. J. Simpson.  He then moved back to the Cardinals where he played from 1974-1978. Jones was primarily used on special teams but also excelled in short yardage situations at the running back position. He scored 17 touchdowns and averaged 4.0 yards per carry in his NFL career.

References

1951 births
Living people
American football running backs
Buffalo Bills players
Duke Blue Devils football players
St. Louis Cardinals (football) players
People from Sanford, North Carolina
Players of American football from North Carolina